The New Haven EP-5 was a double-ended mercury arc rectifier electric locomotive built in 1955 by General Electric, for the New York, New Haven and Hartford Railroad. It was built to haul passenger trains between Grand Central Terminal or Penn Station in New York City and New Haven, Connecticut. The EP-5s resembled the Alco FA.

The EP-5s were the first AC passenger electric locomotives to use rectifiers to convert alternating current from overhead wires to direct current for the traction motors. They also collected DC from the third rail used by the New York Central, whose tracks the New Haven used to reach Grand Central Terminal.

All of the class were equipped with the Pennsylvania Railroad's cab signal system needed to operate into Penn Station; Washington, D.C.-Boston through trains over the Hell Gate Bridge, plus the Montrealer/Washingtonian, were their main assignment throughout their New Haven careers.

The units were known as "Jets" due to the roaring sound made by their main blowers; an example of this characteristic was inadvertently preserved for posterity in a scene shot at Grand Central Terminal, the very first moments of the movie The Man in the Gray Flannel Suit.

The EP-5s had a reputation for rapid acceleration and high pulling capacity. However, the class also had a tendency to overheat and catch fire due to the crowded, poorly ventilated internal component arrangement, a situation made necessary by the need for the units to conform to the weight restrictions imposed by the New York Central's Park Avenue steel viaduct. This problem was significantly aggravated by the New Haven management's de-emphasis of electric operations in favor of its new dual-power FL9 diesels, and the railroad's financial condition. By 1962, a year after the New Haven entered bankruptcy, only three units were in service. All 10 were quickly rebuilt under the trustees' management, but by the time of the New Haven's 1969 inclusion in Penn Central, four were again out of service (and were soon scrapped). The EP-5s were rapidly replaced on Washington–Boston trains by the reliable former Pennsylvania Railroad GG1 electrics.

When the New Haven was merged into PC, the six units still in service were redesignated as the E-40 class, and were assigned to commuter train service between Grand Central Terminal and New Haven. The E-40s continued in this service, steadily dwindling in number, until May 1973 when the Metropolitan Transportation Authority suddenly banned them after #4971 caught fire in the Park Avenue Tunnel; all went into dead storage. Amtrak passed them up for new electrics. Two of the units, #4973 and #4977, were rebuilt by PC into freight units, stripped of their third-rail capability, steam generators, and one of the two pantographs. They were used in a variety of light-duty freight services, but their utility was limited by their lack of multiple-unit capability and dynamic brakes. Within a year of Penn Central's inclusion into Conrail, the remaining two E-40s were retired. All were scrapped by 1979.

External links

 Model Railroading site with information about the EP5/E40s
 EP5/E40 Pictures and Info
 

EP-5
NH EP-5
C-C locomotives
11 kV AC locomotives
Passenger locomotives
Electric locomotives of the United States
Multi-system locomotives
Scrapped locomotives
Streamlined electric locomotives